The National Socialist Party of New Zealand, sometimes called the New Zealand Nazi Party, was a far-right political party in New Zealand. It promulgated the same basic views as Adolf Hitler's Nazi Party in Germany, and had a particular focus on Arabs, Jews and the banking sector.

From 1969 the party was led by Colin King-Ansell. The party would be dominated by King-Ansell for the duration of its existence. King-Ansell was the party's sole candidate, and contested several elections. He stood for the National Socialists in the general elections of 1972 and 1975 he contested the Eden electorate and in 1978 he contested the seat of Onehunga.

The party dissolved in 1980.

References

Anti-Arabism
Anti-Māori sentiment
Antisemitism in New Zealand
Neo-Nazism in New Zealand
Neo-Nazi political parties
Defunct political parties in New Zealand
Political parties established in 1969